Eyez on the Prize is a hip hop compilation released April 13, 1999 by the Trump Tight record label.

This compilation was planned as a soundtrack to an independent film of the same name which Rodney Hisatake intended to co-produce. The film was to follow the struggles of four fictional brothers migrating from American Samoa to California, illuminating in particular the hardships of two of the brothers who become enmeshed in illicit drug economies. Due to insufficient funding, the film has not, as yet, been made.

Track listing

Disc 1
Dog Eat Dog World (Intro)
Have 'Em Hatin' - Mac Dre/Young Nade (prod. by Jake One)
Eyez On The Prize - Lord Tariq & Peter Gunz/Kutfather
You And Your 9MM - Down-N-Dirty Click (Dirty South)
Night Shift - Richie Rich/Samoends
Game Trump Tight - Snoop Dogg/JT The Bigga Figga/Kutfather (prod. by Jake One)
Interlude - Slim The Pale Pimp/Skrilla Mob
Follow Me - Black Rhino/Skrilla Mobb/Flash
All Day - Savage Gentleman
All My Niggaz - Luniz/2wice/Phats Bossi
Sexy Lil' Neighbor - Dre Dog A.K.A. Andre Nickatina
My Blocks - L.C./Down-N-Dirty Hustlers
Gotta Get My Paper Right (Out Of 10 Niggaz Ain't Real!) - Da' Unda' Dogg/Usual Suspects/Baby Beesh (Latino Velvet)
an't Go Against The Grain (Outro)"

Disc 2
Dead End (Spoken Word) - IPO
Paper Riderz - Samoenoz Ent.
Obey Yo' P.O. - E-40/2wice/Quran
Lace 'Em Up - Big Mack/Maine-O/Family Tyz
Pimps & Playas - San Quinn/G-Boogie/Daveroski
It Takes Dirt To Make Flowers Grow
It's The Mob - Dubee A.K.A. Sugawolf/M.O.H.
You Can't Loose - B-Boy Posse/Kilomai/J-Mack
Dreams Of Being Rich - Big Rob
Slippin' - Rushe
Eastside 'G' Riderz - Brown-N-Proud/Baby Beesh (Latino Velvet)
Ain't Nothin' Changed - Calico/Young Al/Pistal (Usual Suspects)
My Destiny - Usual Suspects
Intro To The Fugitive"	
The Fugitive - Cougnut/Guce/U.D.I.
Outro

References

1999 compilation albums
1999 soundtrack albums
Albums produced by Jake One
Film soundtracks